Dinachal Rural District is a rural district (dehestan) in Pareh Sar District, Rezvanshahr County, Gilan Province, Iran. As of the 2006 census, its population was 19,640, in 4,953 families. The rural district has 18 villages.

References 

Rural Districts of Gilan Province
Rezvanshahr County